Prays endolemma is a moth in the family Plutellidae.

External links
 Prays endolemma at www.catalogueoflife.org.

https://agris.fao.org/agris-search/search.do?recordID=PH9310199

https://gd.eppo.int/taxon/PRAYED
Plutellidae
Moths described in 1967